Tyji Donrapheal Armstrong (born October 3, 1970) is a former professional American football tight end in the National Football League for the Tampa Bay Buccaneers, Dallas Cowboys, and St. Louis Rams. He also was a member of the Chicago Enforcers in the XFL league. He played college football at the University of Mississippi.

Early years
Armstrong attended Robichaud High School, before moving on to Iowa Central Junior College.

After his sophomore season he transferred to the University of Mississippi, where he was a two-year starter as a blocking tight end. As a junior, he was a backup behind Camp Roberts, making 5 receptions for 84 yards (16.8-yard average). As a senior, he registered 16 receptions (fifth on the team) for 304 yards (19-yard avg.) and one touchdown. He finished his college career with 21 receptions for 388 yards (18.5-yard avg.) and one touchdown.

Professional career

Tampa Bay Buccaneers
Armstrong was selected by the Tampa Bay Buccaneers in the third round (79th overall) of the 1992 NFL Draft. As a rookie, he started 7 games and although he was mostly used as a blocking tight end, he was a part of one of the longest passing plays in franchise history, an 81-yard touchdown reception against the Los Angeles Rams on December 6. In 1992 and 1993 he was a backup to Ron Hall, and from 1994 to 1995 to Jackie Harris. He was waived on August 25, 1996.

Dallas Cowboys (first stint)
On August 27, 1996, the Dallas Cowboys signed him for blocking purposes after tight end Kendell Watkins was lost for the season. He appeared in 16 games with 7 starts, registering 2 receptions for 10 yards. He announced his retirement after the Cowboys didn't re-sign him and selected David LaFleur in the first round of the 1997 NFL Draft.

St. Louis Rams
On July 19, 1998, he was signed by the St. Louis Rams as a free agent. He played as a backup in 12 games, while making 6 receptions for 54 yards. He retired at the end of the season because he felt that he should be starting over rookie tight end Ernie Conwell.

Dallas Cowboys (second stint)
On August 17, 2000, he was signed as a free agent by the Dallas Cowboys. On August 27, he was released to make room for tight end O.J. Santiago.

Chicago Enforcers
In 2001, he signed with the Chicago Enforcers of the XFL league and was coached under Ron Meyer. He posted 6 receptions for 49 yards and played with the team until the league folded at the end of its debut season.

Personal life
His mother suffered a fatal heart attack while watching him play against the Chicago Bears on October 18, 1992.

References

External links
XFL bio

1970 births
Living people
People from Dearborn Heights, Michigan
Players of American football from Michigan
American football tight ends
Iowa Central Tritons football players
Ole Miss Rebels football players
Tampa Bay Buccaneers players
Dallas Cowboys players
St. Louis Rams players
Chicago Enforcers players